Contracheirurus is a trilobite in the order Phacopida that existed during the lower Silurian of what is now the Northwest Territories of Canada. It was described by Hatterton and Perry in 1984, and the type species is Contracheirurus zuvegesi.

References

External links
 Contracheirurus at the Paleobiology Database

Silurian trilobites of North America
Fossil taxa described in 1984
Fossils of Canada
Paleontology in the Northwest Territories
Paleozoic life of the Northwest Territories
Cheiruridae
Phacopida genera